Charles McPherson may refer to:

Charles McPherson (musician) (born 1939), jazz saxophonist
Charles McPherson (album), recorded in 1971
Charles Duncan McPherson (1877–1970), cabinet minister in Manitoba
Charles Robert McPherson (born 1926), senior pastor of the Riverside Church in Denver

See also
Charles Macpherson Dobell (1869–1954), Canadian general